Winebrenner Run  is a Pennsylvania stream in Gettysburg, Pennsylvania, flowing eastward to Rock Creek originally from a Gettys-Black Divide triple point (with Stevens Run & Guinn Run) near Zeigler's Grove.  The Confederate military line along the stream was the starting point for the battle of East Cemetery Hill on the Battle of Gettysburg, Second Day, and most of the upstream portion of the run was engineered  into underground drainage to open flow at the school complex near the Culp Farm at East Confederate Avenue.

Rivers of Adams County, Pennsylvania
Rivers of Pennsylvania
Tributaries of the Monocacy River